Julie Halard and Arantxa Sánchez Vicario were the defending champions, but none competed this year. Sánchez Vicario opted to focus on the singles tournament, finishing as runner-up.

Lindsay Davenport and Mary Joe Fernández won the title by defeating Amanda Coetzer and Linda Wild 6–3, 6–2 in the final.

Seeds

Draw

Draw

References

External links
 Official results archive (ITF)
 Official results archive (WTA)

Nichirei International Championships
1995 WTA Tour